BRP Cabra (MRRV-4409) is the eighth ship of the Parola-class patrol vessels of the Philippine Coast Guard.

Design and features
The Philippine Coast Guard clarified that the ship is a law enforcement vessel and is designed to conduct environmental and humanitarian missions, as well as maritime security operations and patrol missions.

The ship was designed with a bulletproof navigation bridge, and is equipped with fire monitors, night vision capability, a work boat, and radio direction finder capability.

The ship will be equipped with communications and radio monitoring equipment from Rohde & Schwarz, specifically the M3SR Series 4400 and Series 4100 software-defined communication radios, and DDF205 radio monitoring equipment. These equipment enhances the ship's reconnaissance, pursuit and communications capabilities.

Construction, delivery and commissioning

Operational history 
In April 2018, the BRP Cabra was sent to Boracay in Caticlan to conduct Maritime Patrols around the world-famous island for the duration of its six-month closure that started on April 26, 2018.

The BRP Gregorio del Pilar was eventually pulled out from the shoal a couple of days later.

References

Cabra
2018 ships
Ships built by Japan Marine United